Mylee Grace (born 1985) is an Australian musician signed to Love Police Records. She is married to surfer-artist Ozzie Wright. They have two children.

Career 
Mylee Grace recorded her first EP Songs From Cat Hill when she was 16 years old. The EP featured the song Thesaurus Rex which earned airplay on FBi Radio and later re-released in 2011 on her EP Baby Talk, supported by a video for the song Valley Of Scum.

After giving birth to her first child at 22, Grace accompanied her husband Ozzie Wright on a tour of Europe with his band The Goons of Doom. The couple had first met when Grace was ten and Wright was nineteen. They now have two children.

Following her EP, Mylee Grace performed as Mylee & The Milkshakes and released an album with her husband called Mylee Grace and Ozzy Wrong Songs, which they recorded in one week during 2013. The album was promoted with a video for the song Too Much To Dream. Wright later used some of the album lyrics on graphics for a clothing collaboration with Volcom.

In 2020 it was reported  Mylee Grace had been working on a new album, and that music began to appear the following year after Love Police announced her album would come out on their relaunched record label.

Mylee Grace returned in 2021 with Someday Song, an early single from her album Whiplash In The Moshpit. The new song caught the attention of Rolling Stone Australia who called it "equal parts hazy, relaxing, and resonant." The album was likened to a mix of The Band, Mazzy Star, and The Velvet Underground. It is made up of songs written over a seven-year period, with the title taken from one of her song lyrics.

Discography 

 Baby Talk EP (2011)
 Mylee Grace and Ozzy Wrong Songs (2013)
 Whiplash In The Moshpit (2021)

References 

Living people
Australian musicians
1985 births
Musicians from Sydney